The Flying Guillotine may refer to:

Film
The Flying Guillotine (film), a 1975 Hong Kong film directed by Meng Hua Ho
The Guillotines, 2012 remake of the 1975 film
The Fatal Flying Guillotines, 1977 Taiwanese-Hong Kong film directed by Raymond Lui
Lu Si Niang da po xue di zi, 1956 Hong Kong film released in English as Fourth Madam Lu Thrashes the Flying Guillotine
Master of the Flying Guillotine, 1976 Taiwanese wuxia film directed by Jimmy Wang
Palace Carnage, 1978 Hong Kong film directed by Kang Cheng and Shan Hua, released in English as Flying Guillotine 2
Zatoichi & the Flying Guillotine, 1973 Taiwanese film directed by Chung Hsun Tu

Music
"Flying Guillotine", song on the 2005 The 16 Deadly Improvs album The Return of the 16 Deadly Improvs
"Flying Guillotine", song on the 1996 Buckethead album The Day of the Robot
"Flying Guillotines", 2005 12" hip-hop record by DJ JS-1
"The Flying Guillotine", 2019 12" single by the electronic group Serenace
Master of the Flying Guillotine, 2005 debut album by American rapper Jumpsteady